Gordeyevsky is a rural locality (a khutor) in Ozerkinskoye Rural Settlement, Kikvidzensky District, Volgograd Oblast, Russia. The population was 2 as of 2010.

Geography 
Gordeyevsky is located on Khopyorsko-Buzulukskaya plain, on the right bank of the Buzuluk River, 16 km northeast of Preobrazhenskaya (the district's administrative centre) by road. Peschanovka is the nearest rural locality.

References 

Rural localities in Kikvidzensky District